In two-dimensional works of art, such as painting, printmaking, photography or bas-relief, repoussoir (pushing back) is an object along the right or left foreground that directs the viewer's eye into the composition by bracketing (framing) the edge. It became popular with Mannerist and Baroque artists, and is found frequently in Dutch seventeenth-century landscape paintings. Jacob van Ruisdael, for example, often included a tree along one side to enclose the scene (see illustration). Figures are also commonly employed as repoussoir devices by artists such as Paolo Veronese, Peter Paul Rubens and Impressionists such as Gustave Caillebotte.

References 

Artistic techniques
Painting techniques
Photographic techniques
Composition in visual art